This is a comprehensive list of interplanetary spaceflights, spaceflight between two or more bodies of the Solar System, listed in chronological order by launch date.  It includes only flights that escaped Earth orbit and reached the vicinity of another planet, asteroid, or comet. Flights that were planned but not executed, were destroyed at or shortly after launch, or missed their target entirely are not included. Flights which reached, but failed to return useful scientific data regarding their target, are given a gray background.

The list is divided between flights that stopped at a destination, and those that flew by their target.

Completed flights
The following flights were completed by matching velocity with the target object, whether by station-keeping, entering orbit, landing, or impact.

1960s

1970s

1980s

1990s

2000s

2010s

2020s

Passing flights
The following flights flew by the target object at close range, but did not match velocity with their target or continued to another destination.

1960s

1970s

1980s

1990s

2000s

2010s

References

See also
List of missions to the outer planets

Lists of spacecraft
Spaceflight timelines